Carrier of Record (or COR) for telecommunications, refers to the entity that provides PSTN (Public Switched Telephone Network) service for an E.164 number.  The exact definition of who and what is a COR is ultimately the responsibility of the relevant national regulatory authority.

See also
Outline of telecommunication

References

Telephony